Stay LDS / Mormon ("Latter-day Saint") is a collaborative blog featuring discussion and commentary about Mormon issues, beliefs, culture, thought and current events. It was created by Brian Johnston and John Dehlin, formerly of the Sunstone Education Foundation.

The blog's primary focus is issues of concern to Mormons experiencing disaffection or crisis of their faith. The individual contributors may share their own experiences to provide an informal support group.

See also 

 Bloggernacle
 Blogs about Mormons and Mormonism
 Criticism of the Church of Jesus Christ of Latter-day Saints
 Cultural Mormon
 Culture of The Church of Jesus Christ of Latter-day Saints
 Ex-Mormon
 Exmormon Foundation
 Groups within Mormonism
 FAIR Blog
 List of former or dissident LDS
 New Order Mormon
 PostMormon Community

References

External links
Stay LDS / Mormon
"Website Aims to Be Resource for Struggling Mormons", a 2009-07-21 interview with a StayLDS.com site administrator, by Jeff Robinson on KCPW

American religious websites
Blogs about Mormons and Mormonism
Internet properties established in 2009